Oohakachavadam is a 1988 Indian Malayalam-language film, directed by K. Madhu. The film stars Adoor Bhasi, Balachandra Menon, Murali Suhasini and Prathapachandran in the lead roles. The film has musical score by M. G. Radhakrishnan.

Cast
Balachandra Menon as Alex
Suhasini as Malathi
Thiagarajan as Rocky Fernandez 
Jagathy Sreekumar as Gopi Koothrappally
Sreenath as Balan
Janardhanan as Menon 
Sukumari as Nun
Lalu Alex as Hassan Koya
Prathapachandran as Varma
Jagannatha Varma as Achuthan Marar
K. P. A. C. Sunny as Advocate Jose 
Oduvil Unnikrishnan as Naseema's Father
Mammukoya as Abdullah 
Paravoor Bharathan as Iyer
Adoor Bhasi as Shah
Unni Mary as Meera
Jose Prakash as Fernandez 
Kollam Thulasi as Police Officer 
Kothuku Nanappan as Meera's Father
James as James
Priya as Naseema
Shyama as Amina

Soundtrack
The music was composed by M. G. Radhakrishnan.

References

External links
  
 

1988 films
1980s Malayalam-language films
Films directed by K. Madhu